Edwin J. Godfrey (16 September 193212 April 2002) was a United States Marine Corps general.

Personal life
Edwin J. Godfrey was born on 16 September 1932 in Montclair, New Jersey.  He graduated from Dartmouth College in 1954, and died on 12 April 2002 in San Diego, California.

Military career
Godfrey was commissioned a second lieutenant in the United States Marine Corps in 1954.

During the Vietnam War, he was assigned to the 3rd Marine Division as commander of the 3rd Shore Party Battalion and then as S-3 of the 9th Marines.  In the late 1970s, Godfrey worked with the Joint Chiefs of Staff and the staff of Sylvester R. Foley Jr.—commander of the United States Seventh Fleet.  From 1981–84, he was "Assistant Division Commander of the 3d Marine Division", commander of the 9th Marine Amphibious Brigade, and commander of the 3d Force Service Support Group.

In 1987, Major General Godfrey was the commander of III Marine Amphibious Force in Okinawa, Japan.  That 9 September, President Ronald Reagan nominated Godfrey to take command of United States Marine Corps Forces, Pacific with a commisserate promotion to lieutenant general and a move to Camp H. M. Smith in Hawaii.  Having accepted the promotion, Lieutenant General Godfrey retired from the Marines on 1 November 1989, receiving the Navy Distinguished Service Medal for his service "as Commanding General, Fleet Marine Force, Pacific/Commander, Marine Corps Bases, Pacific, from 2 October 1987 to 31 October 1989."

References

1932 births
2002 deaths
Dartmouth College alumni
military personnel from New Jersey
people from Montclair, New Jersey
recipients of the Distinguished Service Medal (United States)
United States Marine Corps generals
United States Marine Corps personnel of the Vietnam War